November was Gustave Flaubert's first completed work, a novella first completed in 1842.

Synopsis
In the first part of the novella, the narrator is a schoolboy, and the narrative consists of his meditations on life, as well as his longing for sexual awakening and the beginning of his adult life. He perceives himself as a voyeur, witnessing couples, sumptuous dining rooms, professionals at work and scenes of family life.

In the second part, the young author loses his virginity with Marie, a worldly-wise courtesan who recounts her personal story of erotic experience. Initially, she was a virginal sixteen-year-old until she was unwillingly married to an elderly suitor who wanted a younger mistress. In return for her acquiescence, though, she has acquired sexual freedom and experience. However, as the reader later learns, she subsequently becomes a tabula rasa, providing her body for the enjoyment of men, but not her individuality or personality.

In the concluding section of the novella, the adolescent narrator tries to revisit Marie, but the courtesan and her brothel of residence have vanished. The narrator takes up study toward a legal career, but has already eschewed marriage or professional life. Eventually, he dies.

Literary antecedents
In his biography of Flaubert, Frederick Brown compares the narrator to other literary adolescents, such as Chateaubriand's René (1802), Abbé Prévost's Chevalier des Grieux (1731), Goethe's Werther (1734), Musset's Octave and others, who also fail to become adults due to their inability to reach maturity (psychological), although parents are not mentioned in November, unlike similar contemporary works. Brown concludes that it is a work of authorial adolescence.

Marie, in Frederick Brown's interpretation, is understood to be a fictionalised rendition of Eulalie Foucauld, the thirty-five-year-old Toulon innkeeper who provided Flaubert with his own sexual initiation in 1840.

Notes

References
Gustave Flaubert: (edited by Claudine Gothor-Mersch Les Memoires d'un fou, Novembre, Pyrenees-Corse, Voyage en Italie: Paris: Gallimard (Folio): 2001.

1842 French novels
Works by Gustave Flaubert
French autobiographical novels
French bildungsromans
French novellas